The Central Connecticut Blue Devils baseball team is a varsity intercollegiate athletic team of Central Connecticut State University in New Britain, Connecticut, United States. The team is a member of the Northeast Conference, which is part of the National Collegiate Athletic Association's Division I. Central Connecticut State's first baseball team was fielded in 1935. The team plays its home games at CCSU Baseball Field in New Britain, which opened in 2010 and seats 1,000. The Blue Devils are coached by Charlie Hickey.

The Blue Devils have claimed five Northeast Conference baseball tournament championships and appeared in the NCAA Division I Baseball Championship five times.  The 2010 team set several offensive school records en route to  a recent Regional appearance in the Norwich Regional. The 2017 team was the most recent to reach the NCAA tournament.

Coaching history
This table reflects the documented coaching history through the 2016 season.

Season-by-season record
{| class="wikitable"

|- align="center"

See also
List of NCAA Division I baseball programs

References

External links
 Official website